is a railway station in Miyazaki City, Miyazaki Prefecture, Japan.

Lines

Layout 
The station, which is unstaffed, consists of a side and an island platform serving two tracks. The station building is timber structure of traditional Japanese design with a double tiled roof. Half of the building houses a cafe while the other half has a  houses a waiting area and an automatic ticket vending machine. Access to the island platform is by means of a footbridge.

Adjacent stations

History
The track was extended east in phases, with Aoidake opening as the new terminus on 21 March 1916. On the same day, Tano was opened as an intermediate station on this new stretch. The line was renamed the Miyazaki Main Line on 21 September 1917. On 15 December 1923, the entire stretch of track from Shigeoka through Miyazaki to Yoshimatsu, including Tano, was designated as part of the Nippō Main Line. With the privatization of Japanese National Railways (JNR), the successor of JGR, on 1 April 1987, the station came under the control of JR Kyushu.

Passenger statistics
In fiscal 2016, the station was used by an average of 600 passengers daily (boarding passengers only), and it ranked 225th among the busiest stations of JR Kyushu.

See also
List of railway stations in Japan

References

External links
Tano (JR Kyushu)

Railway stations in Miyazaki Prefecture
Railway stations in Japan opened in 1916